Neser may refer to:

People
 Jakob Neser (1883–1965), German wrestler
 Michael Neser (born 1990), Australian cricket player
 Vivian Neser (1894–1956), South African cricket player and lawyer

Other
 Nesër TV, Albanian TV channel